Graham Anthony Devine (born 1971 in Liverpool, Merseyside) is an English classical guitarist.

Devine studied with Gordon Crosskey at Chetham's School of Music in Manchester. He moved to Brazil at the age of nineteen and quickly became known there as a teacher and performer.

Devine has been a laureate of many international competitions, including the Mottola International Guitar Competition in Italy, the Certamen Francisco Tárrega in Benicàssim, Spain, and the Stotsenberg International Guitar Competition in the United States. He won first prize at the 2002 Alhambra International Guitar Competition in Alcoy, Spain, and again at the Emilio Pujol Guitar Competition in Italy.

He has recorded three CDs for Naxos Records, featuring music by Leo Brouwer, Antonio Carlos Jobim, Alan Rawsthorne, Heitor Villa-Lobos and William Walton, among others. His other recordings for Granary-Guitars include music by Johann Sebastian Bach, Enrique Granados, Manuel Ponce, Joaquín Rodrigo and Domenico Scarlatti and the first recording of Federico Moreno Torroba's Sonata-Fantasia.

Graham Anthony Devine is known for his varied use of tone colour on the guitar, a style which many have compared with that of Julian Bream, whom Devine has called "the greatest guitarist of the 20th century."

He is currently a guitar tutor at Trinity College of Music in London.

References

External links
 Graham Anthony Devine's website

Discography
Appassionata (Granary Guitars 2002)  Granary Guitars
Leo Brouwer: Guitar Music, Vol. 3 (Naxos 2003)
Burgalesa (Granary Guitars 2004)
Manhã de Carnaval: Guitar Music from Brazil (Naxos 2004)
British Guitar Music (Naxos 2005)
Leo Brouwer: Guitar Music, Vol. 4 to be released (Naxos 2007)

English classical guitarists
English male guitarists
1971 births
Living people
Musicians from Liverpool
21st-century British guitarists
21st-century British male musicians